The Republican Bicentennial Vanguard is a Venezuelan socialist political party that supports the governing coalition Great Patriotic Pole. Two of the party's candidates were elected to the National Assembly in the 2015.

Electoral performance

References

External links 
 

2007 establishments in Venezuela
Anti-imperialist organizations
Bolivarian Revolution
Democratic socialist parties in South America
Political parties established in 2007
Political parties in Venezuela
Socialist parties in Venezuela